Artur Viehoff (born 14 December 1885) was a footballer who played for FC Basel as forward or as midfielder in the early 1900s.

Football career
Viehoff joined Basel's first team during their 1901–02 season. He played his first game for the club in the away friendly game on 26 January 1902 as Basel won 3–1 against FC Mulhouse. He did not play in any league games this season.

Viehoff played his domestic league debut for the club in the home game in the Landhof on 25 October 1903 as Basel won 3–1 against Fortuna Basel. Viehoff became regular player for the team in their 1903–04 season.

During the next two season Viehoff played with Basel's second team, who at that time played in the Serie B, the second highest tier of Swiss football. 

Viehoff played with the first team again in their 1906–07 season. During his time with the first team, Viehoff played in at least six games. Four of these games were in the Series A and two were friendly games.

Notes

Footnotes

Incomplete league matches 1903–1904 season: Bern-FCB, FCB-OB

Incomplete league matches 1906–1907 season: YB-FCB, OB-FCB, FCB-YB, FCB-Aarau

References

Sources
 Rotblau: Jahrbuch Saison 2017/2018. Publisher: FC Basel Marketing AG. 
 Die ersten 125 Jahre. Publisher: Josef Zindel im Friedrich Reinhardt Verlag, Basel. 
 Verein "Basler Fussballarchiv" Homepage

FC Basel players
Association football midfielders
Association football forwards
Swiss Super League players
1885 births
Date of death missing
Swiss men's footballers